Colcha District is one of nine districts of the province Paruro, Peru.

Ethnic groups 
The people in the district are mainly indigenous citizens of Quechua descent. Quechua is the language which the majority of the population (95.49%) learn to speak in childhood, 4.35% of the residents started speaking using the Spanish language (2007 Peru Census).

See also 
 Pumawasi

References